Medeterella is a genus of flies in the family Dolichopodidae. It contains nine species formerly included in Medetera in the M. salomonis species group. The species are found in the Afrotropical, Oriental and Australasian regions. According to Naglis and Bickel (2012), it was unwarranted to establish a separate genus for this group of species.

Species
 Medeterella austrofemoralis (Bickel, 1987)
 Medeterella femoralis (Becker, 1922)
 Medeterella malayensis (Bickel, 1987)
 Medeterella mooneyensis (Bickel, 1987)
 Medeterella nigrohalterata (Parent, 1932)
 Medeterella olivacea (De Meijere, 1916)
 Medeterella pospelovi (Grichanov, 1997)
 Medeterella pseudofemoralis (Bickel, 1987)
 Medeterella salomonis (Parent, 1941)

References 

Dolichopodidae genera
Medeterinae